Mount Gilead, Tennessee (sometimes called Mt. Gilead) is an unincorporated community located in Henderson County, Tennessee, United States at latitude 35.766 and longitude -88.54, at an elevation of 561 feet. It is on O'Brien Road west of Tennessee Highway 104, approximately 8 kilometres south-southeast of Cedar Grove, Tennessee. As late as 1926, Mount Gilead had its own school.

References 

Unincorporated communities in Henderson County, Tennessee
Unincorporated communities in Tennessee